Wang Changyi is a Chinese diplomat. He was Ambassador of the People's Republic of China to Djibouti (1983–1985), Syria (1986–1989). He was a member of the 9th (1998–2003) and 10th (2003–2008) Chinese People's Political Consultative Conference.

References

1936 births
Ambassadors of China to Djibouti
Ambassadors of China to Syria
Ambassadors of China to Israel
Members of the 9th Chinese People's Political Consultative Conference
Members of the 10th Chinese People's Political Consultative Conference
Possibly living people